The Mines (Prohibition of Child Labour Underground) Act 1900 was an Act of the Parliament of the United Kingdom. The statute prevented boys under the age of thirteen from working, or being (for the purposes of employment) in an underground mine.

An estimated 3000 boys were affected by the new law, which was passed on 30 July 1900.

The act was repealed in full by the Mines and Quarries Act 1954 (c. 70); by such time the act was out of date and was no longer necessary due to the stronger provisions in the Employment of Women, Young Persons, and Children Act 1920.

See also
Mining in the United Kingdom

References

United Kingdom Acts of Parliament 1900
United Kingdom labour law
Coal mining in the United Kingdom
Child labour law
Mining law and governance
Underground mining
1900 in labor relations